Lancejet may refer to:
A planned underwater variation of the Gyrojet (a hand-held rocket-firing firearm)
A brand of pressure washer nozzle